The Mounts Palay-Palay–Mataas-na-Gulod Protected Landscape is a  protected area encompassing the Palay-Palay Mountain Range in southwestern Luzon island near Manila in the Philippines. In 2007, the national park was designated as a protected landscape area under the National Integrated Protected Areas System through Proclamation No. 1315 signed by President Gloria Arroyo. The park is the last remaining lowland rainforest in the province of Cavite and is well known for Mount Pico de Loro, a popular destination for mountaineers and hikers from Metro Manila.

Description

The Palay-Palay protected landscape area is situated in the mountain range that forms the border between the densely populated provinces of Cavite and Batangas in the Calabarzon region. It contains parts of the municipalities of Maragondon and Ternate in Cavite and Nasugbu in Batangas and is spread over four barangays, namely Sapang, Pinagsanhan, Patungan and Papaya, and seven sitios, namely Malauyas, Caynipa, Caytako, Cacabay, Magabe, Murangdalig and Hamilo. It is bounded on the north by the coves and beaches of Ternate including Caylabne Bay and Puerto Azul, on the south by the rolling hills and farmlands of Nasugbu, on the west by Limbones Cove, and on the east by the rolling plateau of Maragondon.

Mount Palay-Palay, located in the park's northern portion, covers sixty percent of the protected area. A major attraction in the park is Mount Pico de Loro at the southern portion which was named for the towering formation at its summit which resembles a parrot's beak. It is also the highest mountain in Cavite at   where hikers are rewarded with scenic views of Manila Bay and its islands, and South China Sea, as well as the coves and beaches of Nasugbu including Mounts Batulao and Carilao (Talamitam). Other notable peaks in the mountain range include Mount Marami, Mount Buntis and Mount Nagpatong where the Filipino revolutionary Andres Bonifacio was executed in 1897, and Mounts Kalanggaman and Dos Picos at the center of the protected landscape.

Bird sanctuary
The protected landscape is an important bird area having been initially proclaimed a game refuge and bird sanctuary. It is home to a diverse number of bird species such as the Philippine eagle-owl, Philippine falconet, Philippine hawk-cuckoo, Philippine drongo-cuckoo, Philippine hawk-owl, ashy thrush, brahminy kite, crested serpent eagle, Philippine fairy-bluebird, Philippine trogon, black-chinned fruit dove, island swiftlet, Philippine bulbul, Pacific swallow, Luzon hornbill and Philippine pygmy woodpecker.

Accessibility

It is easily accessible via the new Ternate–Nasugbu mountain road completed in July 2013 which runs through the northwestern portion of the protected landscape from the western terminus of Governor's Drive in downtown Ternate to the seaside resorts of Nasugbu. It is also accessible by ferry boat from the Mall of Asia Pier in Bay City, Metro Manila.

A  trail traversing the mountains of the protected landscape has been mapped and established by a five-man expedition team in 2014, to which the trail starts at Barangay Ramirez of Magallanes, Cavite passing through Mataas na Gulod, Dos Picos, Kalanggaman, and ends at Mount Palay-Palay towards the exit at Barangay Papaya in Nasugbu, Batangas. The trail passes through Anino River, a high-elevation river between the mountains of Dos Picos, Kalanggaman and Mataas na Gulod.

See also
 Luzon rainforest

References

External links

Protected landscapes of the Philippines
Birdwatching sites in the Philippines
Geography of Cavite
Tourist attractions in Cavite
Geography of Batangas
Tourist attractions in Batangas
Protected areas established in 1976
1976 establishments in the Philippines